UBR may refer to:

 Unspecified Bit Rate, a traffic contract used to guarantee quality of service for networks
 Universal broadband router, an alternate name for a cable modem termination system
 Uniform Business Rate, see Business rates in England and Wales
 "U.B.R. (Unauthorized Biography of Rakim)", a song by Nas  from the album Street's Disciple 
 Unmatched Brutality Records
 University Boat Race
 Ubrub Airport, Indonesia (by IATA airport code)
 UDDI Business Registry (UBR), also known as the Public Cloud, is a conceptually single system built from multiple nodes having their data synchronized through replication.